Empik (stylised as empi̓k) is a Polish commercial chain selling books, international press and media products (including film, music, and software). The chain also owns a photo company, Empik Foto, as well as a foreign language school, Empik School.

History 
EMPiK chain began during Poland's communist period as KMPiK (the International Press and Book Club) owned by the Prasa-Książka-Ruch monopoly which financed the PZPR Party from its revenue. In 1991 it was acquired by businessmen Jacek Dębski, Janusz Romanowski (a former reserve police officer) and Yaron Bruckner, and given its current name. While initially it was partially owned by the Polish state,  in 1994 it was sold completely by the State Treasury to Bruckner's Eastbridge N.V. In May 2009 EMPiK had 134 stores in Poland and 23 stores in Ukraine.

See also
 List of bookstore chains

Notes

External links

Companies based in Warsaw
Retail companies established in 1991
Bookstores of Poland
Language schools
Polish brands
Polish Limited Liability Companies